Spectabilis may refer to:

vir spectabilis, a senatorial rank in ancient Rome
Ulmus glabra 'Spectabilis', an elm cultivar

See also